The Square Deceiver is a 1917 American silent romantic comedy film directed by Fred J. Balshofer and starring Harold Lockwood, Pauline Curley and William Clifford.

Cast 
 Harold Lockwood as Billy Van Dyke
 Pauline Curley as Beatrice Forsythe
 William Clifford as William Pugfeather
 Dora Mills Adams as Mrs. Pugfeather
 Kathryn Hutchinson as Celia Pugfeather
 Betty Marvin as Edith Van Dyke
 Richard L'Estrange as Dick Blakesley

References

Bibliography 
 Lowe, Denise. An Encyclopedic Dictionary of Women in Early American Films: 1895–1930. Routledge, 2014.

External links 
 

1917 films
1917 comedy films
American silent feature films
American comedy films
American black-and-white films
Films directed by Fred J. Balshofer
Metro Pictures films
1910s English-language films
1910s American films
Silent American comedy films